Apricot Computers was a British electronic company that produced desktop personal computers in the mid-1980s.

Outline
Apricot Computers was a British manufacturer of business personal computers, founded in 1965 as "Applied Computer Techniques" (ACT), later changing its name to Apricot Computers, Ltd. It was a wholly owned UK company until it was acquired in the early 1990s by the Mitsubishi Electric Corporation. It was hoped that this acquisition would help them compete against Japanese PC manufacturers, in particular NEC which commanded over 50% of the Japanese market at the time. Mitsubishi eventually shut down the Apricot brand; a management buyout resulted in new company Network Si UK Ltd being formed. In 2008 a new, independent Apricot company was launched in the UK.

Apricot was an innovative computer hardware company, whose Birmingham R&D centre could build every aspect of a personal computer except for the integrated circuits (chips) themselves; from custom BIOS and system-level programming to the silk-screen of motherboards and metal-bending for internal chassis all the way to radio-frequency testing of a finished system. This coupled with a smart and aggressive engineering team allowed Apricot to be the first company in the world with several technical innovations including the first commercial shipment of an all-in-one system with a 3.5-inch floppy drive (ahead of Apple). In the early 1990s they also manufactured one of the world's most secure x86-based PCs, which was sold exclusively to the UK government.

Their technical innovation led them down some paths which were technically advanced but proved to be highly disadvantageous in the marketplace. For example, when IBM abandoned their ill-fated but technically superior Micro Channel Architecture (MCA), Apricot was the only other OEM using it, in their Apricot Qi and VX FT ranges of PCs. This left the company at a technical dead-end without the financial or market power which helped IBM survive the failure of MCA.

Apricot continued to experiment with unusual form-factors in a market dominated by standardized 'beige boxes'. They produced a range of high-availability servers (the VX and Shogun ranges) with integrated uninterruptible power supply (UPS), low-profile 'LANStation' PCs specifically designed for use on office networks, and diskless workstations booted over the network.

This long-running pattern of tenaciously investing in technical innovation and complete end-to-end system design and manufacture created technically excellent computers, but meant that Apricot was slow to adapt as the worldwide market grew and changed. By the mid-1990s major PC OEMs such as Compaq and Hewlett-Packard were outsourcing their own complete end-to-end system design and manufacture to Original Design Manufacturers (ODMs) based in Taiwan, and were moving at least some of their manufacturing to cheaper locations overseas.

Apricot was very late in adopting this method of manufacturing, even though a motherboard designed and manufactured in Asia cost Apricot as little as a third of the cost of design and testing in Birmingham and manufacture in Scotland.

Apricot eventually tried to move to outsourcing but the market outpaced them, and MELCO closed the company down, selling off the final assets in 1999. A management buyout resulted in new company Network Si UK Ltd being formed.

History

1980s 
In 1982 ACT released their first microcomputer, built by another company but marketed under the ACT brand. In America it was a moderate success. Later in 1982 ACT signed a deal with Victor to distribute the "Victor 9000" as the ACT "Sirius 1" in the UK and Europe. The £2754 "Sirius 1" ran MS-DOS but was not hardware-compatible with the IBM PC.

The Sirius 1 became the most popular 16-bit business computer in Europe, especially in Britain and Germany, while IBM delayed the release of the PC there. Its success led to the Apricot PC or ACT Apricot in September 1983, based on an Intel 8086 microprocessor running at 4.77 MHz. It ran MS-DOS or CP/M-86 but was not compatible at a hardware level with the IBM PC. It had two floppy disks, and was one of the first systems to use 3.5" disks, rather than the 5.25" disks which were the norm at the time.

The graphics quality was critically acclaimed, with an 800×400 resolution and a keyboard with eight "normal" function keys and six flat programmable ones, associated with a built-in LCD screen (40 characters / 2 lines) which displayed the current function of the keys, or could be configured to echo the current command line in MS-DOS. The keyboard contained an integrated calculator; the result of a calculation could be sent to the computer where it would appear on the command line, or in the current application. Microsoft Word and Multiplan were supplied with the Apricot PC. Lotus 123 was also available, and took advantage of the machine's high-resolution graphics. A flap covered the floppy drives when not in use. The industrial design of the machine was well conceived. The keyboard could be clipped to the base of the machine, and an integrated handle used for transporting it. The supplied green phosphor monitor had a nylon mesh glare filter.

A model with a built-in 10 MB hard disk (known as the Apricot PC Xi) was made available later in 1984.

In 1984 ACT released a home computer, the "Apricot F1". It ran MS-DOS with "Activity", a GUI front end; like the Apricot PC, it was not IBM PC compatible. The machine was only successful in the UK. It was bundled with software for graphics, communication, word processing, a spreadsheet, some games, and system tools. It had one 3.5" floppy disk drive.

The same infrared trackball pointing device used with the Apricot Portable was also available for the F1. Also in 1984, the Apricot Portable was released, with an infrared keyboard, a voice system, 4.77 MHz CPU, 640×200 LCD display for £1965.

In 1985 ACT was renamed "Apricot Computers". By this time, the F1 had become one model in the F Series; other machines in the series were the F1e (a cheaper F1 with less RAM standing at 256 KB); the F2 (with two floppy drives) and the F10 (with a 10 MB Rodime hard drive, 512 KB RAM and a more conventional-looking infrared keyboard). The Activity GUI was replaced by GEM. The F1e contained a 360 KB single sided floppy drive, and the F10 contained a 720 KB double sided drive. Some F1e computers shipped with an expansion card that could also be used in the F10, that would modulate the RGB video signal to RF enabling the computer to be used with a domestic television set. This card also contained a composite video output. The machine was unusual in that it contained the same 36-way Centronics parallel port that appeared on many contemporary printers (and continued to do so until virtually replaced with USB and ethernet). This means that a standard 36-way centronics male to centronics male cable needs to be used to connect a printer - and these were hard to find since IBM had introduced the DB25F connector.

The F-series infrared keyboards contained a real-time clock; during the machine's boot sequence, the BIOS would graphically prompt the user to press the 'DATE/TIME' key. This would transmit the date and time settings from the keyboard to the computer via IR, setting the RTC in the computer. The Infra-Red trackball could also be used as a mouse by tilting the unit forward - the ball protrudes from the top and bottom of the unit and can roll on a surface. The units also shipped with fibre-optic 'Light Pipes' that can channel the IR signals, designed to prevent multiple keyboards and trackballs from interfering with adjacent machines in office environments where multiple F-series computers were (predicted to be) in use.

The F10 shipped with a 'PC Emulator' which provided very limited text-mode support for IBM PC compatible applications, but was unable to run applications that used graphics modes. Microsoft Windows 1.03, little-known and little-used at the time, would not run in this environment.

The last Apricot computer not to be IBM compatible was the XEN (October 1985), a 286-based system intended to compete with the IBM AT and running Microsoft Windows (now known as Windows 1.0). It was superseded in 1986 by the XEN-i, the first in a line of IBM-compatible systems. The Xen-i initially shipped with a 5.25" floppy drive to further improve its IBM-compatibility. The 3.5" drive made a reappearance when IBM themselves switched formats with the release of the PS/2 range.

In 1987, Apricot bought the rights to assemble the Sequent Computer Systems multi-processor 80386 Symmetry Unix system in the UK.

In 1989, a cover story in Byte magazine announced the Apricot VX FT Server as the world's first machine to incorporate the Intel 80486 microprocessor. This machine, designed by Bob Cross, was a fault-tolerant file server based on Micro Channel Architecture, incorporating an external RAM cache and its own UPS. The VX FT line consisted of Series 400 and Series 800, with four different models each. These (and their other systems) were manufactured in their state-of-the-art factory in Glenrothes, Fife, Scotland.

British magazines dedicated to the early Apricots were Apricot User, which had the official approval of Apricot Computers, and the more technically oriented Apricot File.

1990s
In January 1990 Apricot acquired Information Technology Limited, a UK-based developer of UNIX systems. Apricot took the opportunity to change its name back to the original, ACT.

In April 1990 ACT's Apricot computer manufacturing business was bought by Mitsubishi, with ACT retaining only the software side. This essentially marked the end of their unique design style. Subsequent products were far more conventional designs.

In 1991, Apricot were the largest partner in a consortium developing a completely new computer-aided dispatch system (LASCAD) for the London Ambulance Service. The IT firm won the contract by significantly underbidding other proposals. Though a later inquiry's examination of the Apricot computer hardware aspect revealed no major problems, the end-to-end solution by the consortium of providers failed disastrously on its first day in full operation, and is often used a case study in the failure of IT project management.

Mitsubishi Electric Apricot models during the 1990s included workstations, LAN terminals and notebooks.

In June 1999 the Glenrothes factory stopped production and in October 1999, Apricot-Mitsubishi European operations were closed. Apricot's assets were sold. A management buyout resulted in a new company, Network Si UK Ltd. It lasted from 2001 to 2014.

Apricot return (2008)
In 2008 a new, independent company was launched in the UK, with its first product coming out in October 2008 - the Apricot Picobook Pro, a VIA NanoBook-based netbook. However, this suffered from poor reviews and the new Apricot Computers Limited was dissolved in May 2012.

See also
 Digital Microsystems Ltd. (DML)

References

Further reading
Stephen Morris: Getting to Know Your Apricot, Duckworth, 1984, 
Mario de Pace: The Apricot Personal Computer, Collins, 1985, 
Peter Gosling: The Apricot, Pitman, 1985, 
Peter Rodwell: Advanced User's Guide to the Apricot Business Computer, Heinemann, London, 1986, 
Peter Rodwell: Introducing the Apricot business computer, Heinemann, London, 1986, 
Peter Rodwell: Introducing the Apricot, Heinemann, London, 1986, 
Peter Rodwell: Business Computing with the Apricot, Heinemann, London, 1986, 
Stephen Morris: Introducing Psion Xchange Software on the Act Apricot, Duckworth, 1985,

External links

ACT/Apricot.org
Apricot PC at old-computers.com
The new Apricot Computers Ltd (2008)
FT server brochure (1992) I
FT server brochure (1992) II
FT server brochure (1992) III

 
Computer companies established in 1965
Defunct computer hardware companies
Defunct computer companies of the United Kingdom
Mitsubishi Electric
Computers designed in the United Kingdom